Portrait of a Couple is a portrait painting by Italian Renaissance artist Niccolò dell'Abbate, dated to  1537–1540. It is now in the Musée des Beaux-Arts of Strasbourg, France. Its inventory number is 641.

It was bought in 1914 for the museum by Wilhelm von Bode with an attribution to Dosso Dossi, and that attribution (to Dossi or his circle) was maintained until 1997. The former title of the painting was A Duke of Ferrara and his Wife.

The double portrait of the count and countess is most unusual in that the emphasis is very much placed on the wife, who is depicted in the act of closing a book that she was just reading, while her husband almost timidly approaches from behind. It appears as a testament to Giulio Boiardo's admiration and love for Silvia Sanvitale's strong intellect and personality.

References 

Paintings in the collection of the Musée des Beaux-Arts de Strasbourg
1530s paintings
Renaissance paintings
Italian paintings
Oil on canvas paintings
16th-century portraits
Paintings of couples
Books in art